William Fetridge may refer to:
 William Harrison Fetridge, vice president of the Boy Scouts of America
 William Pembroke Fetridge, travel writer, publisher, bookseller and periodicals distributor